Denmark competed at the 1984 Summer Paralympics in Stoke Mandeville, Great Britain and New York City, United States. 36 competitors from Denmark won 59 medals including 30 gold, 13 silver and 16 bronze and finished 11th in the medal table.

See also 
 Denmark at the Paralympics
 Denmark at the 1984 Summer Olympics

References 

Denmark at the Paralympics
1984 in Danish sport
Nations at the 1984 Summer Paralympics